Sylhet Sadar is an upazila of Sylhet District in the Division of Sylhet, Bangladesh.

Geography
It has 86,074 households and a total area of 323.17 km2. The city of Sylhet is located within central of Sylhet Sadar.

Demographics
At the 1991 Bangladesh census, Sylhet Sadar had a population of 554,412, of whom 287,304 were aged 18 or older. Males constituted 52.51% of the population, and females 47.49%. Sylhet Sadar had an average literacy rate of 87.6%, among them male 49.0%, female 51.0% (7+ years), and with the national average being 32.4% literate. Major religions are Muslim 81.26%, Hindu 17.43%, Buddhist, Christian and others 0.31%.

Arts and culture 
The rich culture of Sylhet Sadar Upazila includes such major national festivals as Bangladesh Independence Day, Victory Day, Language Movement Day, Pohela Baishakh are widely celebrate in the upazila. Traditional and religious festivals like Eid-ul-Fitr, Eid-ul-Azha, Raspurnima, Jhulan Jatra and Roth Jatra, Christmas and other religious festivals are peacefully and widely celebrated by people of different religions. It is the place of the mausoleum of Shah Jalal. There are also many historical and cultural sites situated in this upazila.

Administration
Sylhet Sadar Upazila is divided into eight union parishads: Hatkhola, Jalalabad, Kandigaon, Khadimnagar, Khadimpara, Mogalgaon, Tuker Bazar, and Tultikar. The union parishads are subdivided into 86 mauzas and 353 villages.

Education 

The average literacy rate of Sylhet Sadar Upazila is 87.6%; male 57.2%, female 44.0%. It is a place of high educational institutions of Sylhet Division. One of the first science and technology universities established in Bangladesh is Shahjalal University of Science and Technology, situated here.

One of the advanced agricultural universities established in Bangladesh is Sylhet Agricultural University.
There are also other colleges such as Sylhet Government College, Sylhet Engineering College, Murari Chand College, and Osmani Medical College,Institute of Health Technology, Sylhet Sylhet Polytechnic Institute. Other notable educational institutions are Sylhet Cadet College, Sylhet Agricultural University, Madan Mohan College, State College, Sylhet Government Women's College Sylhet and Sylhet Law College. There are also four private universities in Sylhet Sadar, namely Leading University, Sylhet International University, Metropolitan University, and North East University.

There are also three private medical colleges in Sylhet Sadar Upazila, namely Jalalabad Ragib-Rabeya Medical College and Hospital, Sylhet Women's Medical College and Parkview Medical College. Jalalabad Ragib-Rabeya Medical College is the largest; established in 1995, founded by philanthropist Ragib Ali and his wife Rabeya Khatun.

Few famous schools around here is: Govt. Agragami Girls High School and College, Sylhet, Sylhet Govt. Pilot High School etc.

There are cantonment public schools and colleges, such as Jalalabad Cantonment Public School and College and Sylhet Cantonment Public School and College, under Bangladesh Army control.

According to Banglapedia, Hazrat Shah Jajal (R) High School and Hazrat Shah Paran (R) High School are notable secondary schools.

See also
 Upazilas of Bangladesh
 Districts of Bangladesh
 Divisions of Bangladesh

References

Upazilas of Sylhet District